Lloyd Kenneth Colteryahn (August 26, 1931 – May 2, 2011) was an American football end. After playing college football at the University of Maryland, he was drafted in the fourth round of the 1953 NFL draft by the Pittsburgh Steelers. Colteryahn played professionally in the National Football League (NFL) for three seasons, from 1954 to 1956, with the Baltimore Colts.  Colteryahn died in Dunedin, Florida, his winter home, on May 2, 2011, after a brief illness.

References

1931 births
2011 deaths
People from Allegheny County, Pennsylvania
American football ends
Maryland Terrapins football players
Baltimore Colts players
Players of American football from Pennsylvania